3rdeyegirl, stylized as 3RDEYEGIRL, is an American funk rock band and was Prince's backing band from his 2014 return to Warner Music until his death in 2016. It was a trio consisting of the American drummer Hannah Welton, Canadian guitarist Donna Grantis and Danish bassist Ida Kristine Nielsen. Together with Prince, they released the LP Plectrumelectrum on September 30, 2014.

Band members
Hannah Welton – drums, vocals (2012–present)
Donna Grantis – guitar, vocals (2012–present)
Ida Kristine Nielsen – bass, vocals (2012–present)

Discography

Studio albums

References

All-female bands
Funk rock musical groups
American musical trios
Musical groups established in 2012
Prince (musician)
2012 establishments in the United States
Musical backing groups